The following is a list of notable actors who have appeared in Royal Shakespeare Company productions and at Stratford.

A 
F. Murray Abraham
Joss Ackland
Dallas Adams
Roger Allam
Sheila Allen
Miles Anderson
Harry Andrews
Francesca Annis
Richard Armitage
Alun Armstrong
Peggy Ashcroft
Eileen Atkins
Hayley Atwell
James Aubrey

B 
Angela Baddeley
Annette Badland
David Bailie
Ian Bannen
Frances Barber
Alan Bates
Simon Russell Beale
Sean Bean
Nicholas Bell
Claire Benedict
Paul Bettany
Christopher Biggins
Colin Blakely
Brian Blessed
Samantha Bond
David Bradley
Kenneth Branagh
Jasper Britton
Brenda Bruce
Richard Burton

C 
Simon Callow
Cheryl Campbell
Denis Carey
Nancy Carroll
James Chalmers
Ian Charleson
Tony Church
David Collings
Shelley Conn
Ron Cook
Judy Cornwell
Oliver Cotton
Brian Cox
Ben Cross
Julian Curry
Tim Curry
Cyril Cusack
Niamh Cusack
Sinéad Cusack
Henry Ian Cusick

D 
Joshua Dallas
Timothy Dalton
Charles Dance
Phil Daniels
Oliver Ford Davies
Daniel Day-Lewis
Judi Dench
Les Dennis
Paola Dionisotti
Jill Dixon
Pip Donaghy
Simon Dormandy
Roy Dotrice
Angela Down
Penny Downie
Amanda Drew
Lindsay Duncan

E 
Christopher Eccleston
Peter Egan
Tamsin Egerton
Jennifer Ehle
Robin Ellis
Edith Evans
Rupert Evans

F 
Nicholas Farrell
Ada Ferrar
Mia Farrow
Emma Fielding
Joseph Fiennes
Ralph Fiennes
Susan Fleetwood
Dexter Fletcher
James Frain
Rosemary Frankau
Philip Franks
Bill Fraser

G 
Ryan Gage
Mariah Gale
Michael Gambon
Romola Garai
William Gaunt
Colin George
John Gielgud
Alexandra Gilbreath
Iain Glen
Robert Glenister
Julian Glover
Patrick Godfrey
Michelle Gomez
Stella Gonet
Michael Goodliffe
Henry Goodman
Marius Goring
Nickolas Grace
Tamsin Greig
Richard Griffiths
Jane Gurnett
Mike Gwilym

H 
David Haig
Victoria Hamilton
Robert Hardy
Davyd Harries
Lisa Harrow
Andrew Havill
Nigel Hawthorne
John Heffernan
Don Henderson
Janet Henfrey
Guy Henry
Greg Hicks
Clare Higgins
Ciarán Hinds
Ian Holm
Michael Hordern
Jane Horrocks
Will Houston
Alan Howard
Nerys Hughes
Gareth Hunt
Kelly Hunter
Colin Hurley
Christopher Hurst
Geoffrey Hutchings
Jonathan Hyde

I 
Barrie Ingham
Jeremy Irons

J 
Glenda Jackson
Derek Jacobi
Emrys James
Neville Jason
Tony Jay
Michael Jayston
Barbara Jefford
Alex Jennings
Richard Johnson
Griffith Jones
Nicholas Jones
Paterson Joseph

K 

Alexis Kanner
Charles Kay
Charles Keating
Geoffrey Keen
Katherine Kelly
Janet Key
Ben Kingsley
Alex Kingston
Michael Kitchen
Alice Krige

L 
Peter Land
Jane Lapotaire
Jude Law
Josie Lawrence
Vivien Leigh
Barbara Leigh-Hunt
Anton Lesser
Damian Lewis
Maureen Lipman
Robert Lindsay
John Lithgow
Robert Longden
Adrian Lukis
Cherie Lunghi
Patti LuPone

M 
Matthew Macfadyen
Art Malik
Lesley Manville
Joseph Marcell
Roger Martin
Daniel Massey
Forbes Masson
Richard McCabe
Alec McCowen
Sylvester McCoy
Ian McDiarmid
Malcolm McDowell
Peter McEnery
Geraldine McEwan
Alistair McGowan
Lloyd McGuire
Ian McKellen
Leo McKern
Don McKillop
Janet McTeer
Joe Melia
Vivien Merchant
Peter Messaline
Helen Mirren
Alfred Molina
Richard Moore
Julian Morris
David Morrissey
Carey Mulligan
Brian Murray
Eve Myles

N 
John Nettles
Jeremy Northam

O 
Gary Oldman
Laurence Olivier
Peter O'Toole
David Oyelowo

P 
Richard Pasco
Trevor Peacock
Bob Peck
Michael Pennington
Edward Petherbridge
Siân Phillips
Ronald Pickup
Tim Pigott-Smith
Christopher Plummer
Eric Porter
Pete Postlethwaite
Mike Pratt
Jonathan Pryce
James Purefoy

Q 
Hugh Quarshie
Anthony Quayle
Caroline Quentin
Diana Quick
Denis Quilley

R 
Michael Redgrave
Vanessa Redgrave
Siobhan Redmond
Roger Rees
Vincent Regan
Emily Richard
Ian Richardson
Joely Richardson
Miles Richardson
Ralph Richardson
Alan Rickman
Diana Rigg
David Rintoul
Linus Roache
Norman Rodway
Paul Rogers
Amanda Root
Clifford Rose
Mark Rylance

S 
Paul Scofield
Nicholas Selby
Fiona Shaw
Sebastian Shaw
Michael Sheen
W. Morgan Sheppard
Antony Sher
John Shrapnel
Michael Siberry
Josette Simon
Donald Sinden
Jonathan Slinger
Georgia Slowe
Timothy Spall
Walter Sparrow
Elizabeth Spriggs
Barry Stanton
Robert Stephens
Toby Stephens
David Sterne
Juliet Stevenson
Patrick Stewart
Mark Strong
Imogen Stubbs
David Suchet
Janet Suzman
Clive Swift
Tilda Swinton

T 
Catherine Tate
David Tennant
Nigel Terry
John Thaw
Gareth Thomas
Sophie Thompson
David Threlfall
Frances de la Tour
David Troughton
Dorothy Tutin
Cathy Tyson
Margaret Tyzack

U 
Mary Ure

V 
Philip Voss

W 
Harriet Walter
Zoë Wanamaker
Derek Waring
David Warner
Dennis Waterman
Gwen Watford
Emily Watson
Ruby Wax
Samuel West
Timothy West
Michael Williams
Nicol Williamson
Penelope Wilton
Clive Wood
John Wood
Peter Woodthorpe
John Woodvine
Peter Woodward
Irene Worth

Y 
Arnold Yarrow
Susannah York

References

 
Royal Shakespeare Company